The Ministry of Posts and Communications or Youchuanbu was a late Qing dynasty ministry responsible for mail and telecommunications and for the Chinese rail network.

It was established in 1906 through the unification of the Imperial Railroad of North China and other railroads with the postal administration and the recently nationalized Imperial Chinese Telegraph Administration.

In 1908, it founded the Bank of Communications to redeem the Beijing–Hankou Railway from its Belgian concessionaires. The bank was also intended to unify funding for steamship lines, railways, and telegraph and postal facilities. After the establishment of the Central Bank of China in 1928, the Bank of Communications was used to fund general industrial development.

After the 1911 revolution gave its name to the Communications Clique during the Warlord Era.

See also 

 History of rail transport in China
 Postage stamps and postal history of China

References 

Government of the Qing dynasty
China
China
History of rail transport in China
Postal history of China